Akhurum (also Romanized as Ākhūrūm) is a village in Hana Rural District, in the Central District of Semirom County, Isfahan Province, Iran. At the 2006 census, its population was 10, in 4 families.

References 

Populated places in Semirom County